Tungen is a rural locality (an ulus) in Kurumkansky District, Republic of Buryatia, Russia. The population was 41 as of 2010.

Geography 
Tungen is located 53 km east of Kurumkan (the district's administrative centre) by road. Arzgun is the nearest rural locality.

References 

Rural localities in Kurumkansky District